

Ge

|- class="vcard"
| class="fn org" | Gearraidh Bhailteas
| class="adr" | Western Isles
| class="note" | 
| class="note" | 
|- class="vcard"
| class="fn org" | Gearraidh Bhaird
| class="adr" | Western Isles
| class="note" | 
| class="note" | 
|- class="vcard"
| class="fn org" | Gearraidh na h-Aibhne
| class="adr" | Western Isles
| class="note" | 
| class="note" | 
|- class="vcard"
| class="fn org" | Geary
| class="adr" | Highland
| class="note" | 
| class="note" | 
|- class="vcard"
| class="fn org" | Gearymore
| class="adr" | Highland
| class="note" | 
| class="note" | 
|- class="vcard"
| class="fn org" | Geat Wolford
| class="adr" | Warwickshire
| class="note" | 
| class="note" | 
|- class="vcard"
| class="fn org" | Gedding
| class="adr" | Suffolk
| class="note" | 
| class="note" | 
|- class="vcard"
| class="fn org" | Geddington
| class="adr" | Northamptonshire
| class="note" | 
| class="note" | 
|- class="vcard"
| class="fn org" | Gedgrave Hall
| class="adr" | Suffolk
| class="note" | 
| class="note" | 
|- class="vcard"
| class="fn org" | Gedintailor
| class="adr" | Highland
| class="note" | 
| class="note" | 
|- class="vcard"
| class="fn org" | Gedling
| class="adr" | Nottinghamshire
| class="note" | 
| class="note" | 
|- class="vcard"
| class="fn org" | Gedney
| class="adr" | Lincolnshire
| class="note" | 
| class="note" | 
|- class="vcard"
| class="fn org" | Gedney Drove End
| class="adr" | Lincolnshire
| class="note" | 
| class="note" | 
|- class="vcard"
| class="fn org" | Gedney Dyke
| class="adr" | Lincolnshire
| class="note" | 
| class="note" | 
|- class="vcard"
| class="fn org" | Gedney Hill
| class="adr" | Lincolnshire
| class="note" | 
| class="note" | 
|- class="vcard"
| class="fn org" | Gee Cross
| class="adr" | Tameside
| class="note" | 
| class="note" | 
|- class="vcard"
| class="fn org" | Geeston
| class="adr" | Rutland
| class="note" | 
| class="note" | 
|- class="vcard"
| class="fn org" | Gegin
| class="adr" | Wrexham
| class="note" | 
| class="note" | 
|- class="vcard"
| class="fn org" | Geilston
| class="adr" | Argyll and Bute
| class="note" | 
| class="note" | 
|- class="vcard"
| class="fn org" | Geinas
| class="adr" | Denbighshire
| class="note" | 
| class="note" | 
|- class="vcard"
| class="fn org" | Geirinis
| class="adr" | Western Isles
| class="note" | 
| class="note" | 
|- class="vcard"
| class="fn org" | Geldeston
| class="adr" | Norfolk
| class="note" | 
| class="note" | 
|- class="vcard"
| class="fn org" | Gell
| class="adr" | Conwy
| class="note" | 
| class="note" | 
|- class="vcard"
| class="fn org" | Gelli
| class="adr" | Pembrokeshire
| class="note" | 
| class="note" | 
|- class="vcard"
| class="fn org" | Gelli
| class="adr" | Rhondda, Cynon, Taff
| class="note" | 
| class="note" | 
|- class="vcard"
| class="fn org" | Gellideg
| class="adr" | Merthyr Tydfil
| class="note" | 
| class="note" | 
|- class="vcard"
| class="fn org" | Gellifor
| class="adr" | Denbighshire
| class="note" | 
| class="note" | 
|- class="vcard"
| class="fn org" | Gelligaer
| class="adr" | Caerphilly
| class="note" | 
| class="note" | 
|- class="vcard"
| class="fn org" | Gelli-gaer
| class="adr" | Neath Port Talbot
| class="note" | 
| class="note" | 
|- class="vcard"
| class="fn org" | Gelligroes
| class="adr" | Caerphilly
| class="note" | 
| class="note" | 
|- class="vcard"
| class="fn org" | Gelli-haf
| class="adr" | Caerphilly
| class="note" | 
| class="note" | 
|- class="vcard"
| class="fn org" | Gellilydan
| class="adr" | Gwynedd
| class="note" | 
| class="note" | 
|- class="vcard"
| class="fn org" | Gellinud
| class="adr" | Neath Port Talbot
| class="note" | 
| class="note" | 
|- class="vcard"
| class="fn org" | Gellygron
| class="adr" | Neath Port Talbot
| class="note" | 
| class="note" | 
|- class="vcard"
| class="fn org" | Gellywen
| class="adr" | Carmarthenshire
| class="note" | 
| class="note" | 
|- class="vcard"
| class="fn org" | Gelsmoor
| class="adr" | Leicestershire
| class="note" | 
| class="note" | 
|- class="vcard"
| class="fn org" | Gelston
| class="adr" | Dumfries and Galloway
| class="note" | 
| class="note" | 
|- class="vcard"
| class="fn org" | Gelston
| class="adr" | Lincolnshire
| class="note" | 
| class="note" | 
|- class="vcard"
| class="fn org" | Gembling
| class="adr" | East Riding of Yorkshire
| class="note" | 
| class="note" | 
|- class="vcard"
| class="fn org" | Gemini
| class="adr" | Cheshire
| class="note" | 
| class="note" | 
|- class="vcard"
| class="fn org" | Gendros
| class="adr" | Swansea
| class="note" | 
| class="note" | 
|- class="vcard"
| class="fn org" | Genesis Green
| class="adr" | Suffolk
| class="note" | 
| class="note" | 
|- class="vcard"
| class="fn org" | Gentleshaw
| class="adr" | Staffordshire
| class="note" | 
| class="note" | 
|- class="vcard"
| class="fn org" | Geocrab
| class="adr" | Western Isles
| class="note" | 
| class="note" | 
|- class="vcard"
| class="fn org" | George Green
| class="adr" | Buckinghamshire
| class="note" | 
| class="note" | 
|- class="vcard"
| class="fn org" | Georgeham
| class="adr" | Devon
| class="note" | 
| class="note" | 
|- class="vcard"
| class="fn org" | George Nympton
| class="adr" | Devon
| class="note" | 
| class="note" | 
|- class="vcard"
| class="fn org" | Georgetown
| class="adr" | Blaenau Gwent
| class="note" | 
| class="note" | 
|- class="vcard"
| class="fn org" | Georgetown
| class="adr" | Dumfries and Galloway
| class="note" | 
| class="note" | 
|- class="vcard"
| class="fn org" | Georgia
| class="adr" | Cornwall
| class="note" | 
| class="note" | 
|- class="vcard"
| class="fn org" | Gerdinen isaf
| class="adr" | Swansea
| class="note" | 
| class="note" | 
|- class="vcard"
| class="fn org" | Gergask
| class="adr" | Highland
| class="note" | 
| class="note" | 
|- class="vcard"
| class="fn org" | Gerlan
| class="adr" | Gwynedd
| class="note" | 
| class="note" | 
|- class="vcard"
| class="fn org" | Germansweek
| class="adr" | Devon
| class="note" | 
| class="note" | 
|- class="vcard"
| class="fn org" | Germiston
| class="adr" | City of Glasgow
| class="note" | 
| class="note" | 
|- class="vcard"
| class="fn org" | Germoe
| class="adr" | Cornwall
| class="note" | 
| class="note" | 
|- class="vcard"
| class="fn org" | Gernon Bushes
| class="adr" | Essex
| class="note" | 
| class="note" | 
|- class="vcard"
| class="fn org" | Gerrans
| class="adr" | Cornwall
| class="note" | 
| class="note" | 
|- class="vcard"
| class="fn org" | Gerrard's Bromley
| class="adr" | Staffordshire
| class="note" | 
| class="note" | 
|- class="vcard"
| class="fn org" | Gerrards Cross
| class="adr" | Buckinghamshire
| class="note" | 
| class="note" | 
|- class="vcard"
| class="fn org" | Gerrick
| class="adr" | Redcar and Cleveland
| class="note" | 
| class="note" | 
|- class="vcard"
| class="fn org" | Geseilfa
| class="adr" | Powys
| class="note" | 
| class="note" | 
|- class="vcard"
| class="fn org" | Geshader
| class="adr" | Western Isles
| class="note" | 
| class="note" | 
|- class="vcard"
| class="fn org" | Gestingthorpe
| class="adr" | Essex
| class="note" | 
| class="note" | 
|- class="vcard"
| class="fn org" | Geuffordd
| class="adr" | Powys
| class="note" | 
| class="note" | 
|- class="vcard"
| class="fn org" | Geufron
| class="adr" | Denbighshire
| class="note" | 
| class="note" | 
|}

Gi

|- class="vcard"
| class="fn org" | Gibbet Hill
| class="adr" | Surrey
| class="note" | 
| class="note" | 
|- class="vcard"
| class="fn org" | Gibbet Hill (near Kenilworth)
| class="adr" | Coventry
| class="note" | 
| class="note" | 
|- class="vcard"
| class="fn org" | Gibbet Hill (near Rugby)
| class="adr" | Warwickshire
| class="note" | 
| class="note" | 
|- class="vcard"
| class="fn org" | Gibb Hill
| class="adr" | Cheshire
| class="note" | 
| class="note" | 
|- class="vcard"
| class="fn org" | Gib Heath
| class="adr" | Birmingham
| class="note" | 
| class="note" | 
|- class="vcard"
| class="fn org" | Gibraltar
| class="adr" | Kent
| class="note" | 
| class="note" | 
|- class="vcard"
| class="fn org" | Gibraltar
| class="adr" | Bedfordshire
| class="note" | 
| class="note" | 
|- class="vcard"
| class="fn org" | Gibraltar
| class="adr" | Buckinghamshire
| class="note" | 
| class="note" | 
|- class="vcard"
| class="fn org" | Gibraltar
| class="adr" | Oxfordshire
| class="note" | 
| class="note" | 
|- class="vcard"
| class="fn org" | Gibshill
| class="adr" | Inverclyde
| class="note" | 
| class="note" | 
|- class="vcard"
| class="fn org" | Gibsmere
| class="adr" | Nottinghamshire
| class="note" | 
| class="note" | 
|- class="vcard"
| class="fn org" | Giddeahall
| class="adr" | Wiltshire
| class="note" | 
| class="note" | 
|- class="vcard"
| class="fn org" | Giddy Green
| class="adr" | Dorset
| class="note" | 
| class="note" | 
|- class="vcard"
| class="fn org" | Gidea Park
| class="adr" | Havering
| class="note" | 
| class="note" | 
|- class="vcard"
| class="fn org" | Gidleigh
| class="adr" | Devon
| class="note" | 
| class="note" | 
|- class="vcard"
| class="fn org" | Giffard Park
| class="adr" | Milton Keynes
| class="note" | 
| class="note" | 
|- class="vcard"
| class="fn org" | Giffnock
| class="adr" | East Renfrewshire
| class="note" | 
| class="note" | 
|- class="vcard"
| class="fn org" | Gifford
| class="adr" | East Lothian
| class="note" | 
| class="note" | 
|- class="vcard"
| class="fn org" | Giffordtown
| class="adr" | Fife
| class="note" | 
| class="note" | 
|- class="vcard"
| class="fn org" | Gigalum Island
| class="adr" | Argyll and Bute
| class="note" | 
| class="note" | 
|- class="vcard"
| class="fn org" | Gigg
| class="adr" | Bury
| class="note" | 
| class="note" | 
|- class="vcard"
| class="fn org" | Giggetty
| class="adr" | Staffordshire
| class="note" | 
| class="note" | 
|- class="vcard"
| class="fn org" | Giggleswick
| class="adr" | North Yorkshire
| class="note" | 
| class="note" | 
|- class="vcard"
| class="fn org" | Giggshill
| class="adr" | Surrey
| class="note" | 
| class="note" | 
|- class="vcard"
| class="fn org" | Gigha Island
| class="adr" | Argyll and Bute
| class="note" | 
| class="note" | 
|- class="vcard"
| class="fn org" | Gighay
| class="adr" | Western Isles
| class="note" | 
| class="note" | 
|- class="vcard"
| class="fn org" | Gignog
| class="adr" | Pembrokeshire
| class="note" | 
| class="note" | 
|- class="vcard"
| class="fn org" | Gilberdyke
| class="adr" | East Riding of Yorkshire
| class="note" | 
| class="note" | 
|- class="vcard"
| class="fn org" | Gilbert's Coombe
| class="adr" | Cornwall
| class="note" | 
| class="note" | 
|- class="vcard"
| class="fn org" | Gilbert's End
| class="adr" | Worcestershire
| class="note" | 
| class="note" | 
|- class="vcard"
| class="fn org" | Gilbert's Green
| class="adr" | Warwickshire
| class="note" | 
| class="note" | 
|- class="vcard"
| class="fn org" | Gilbertstone
| class="adr" | Birmingham
| class="note" | 
| class="note" | 
|- class="vcard"
| class="fn org" | Gilbert Street
| class="adr" | Hampshire
| class="note" | 
| class="note" | 
|- class="vcard"
| class="fn org" | Gilchriston
| class="adr" | East Lothian
| class="note" | 
| class="note" | 
|- class="vcard"
| class="fn org" | Gilcrux
| class="adr" | Cumbria
| class="note" | 
| class="note" | 
|- class="vcard"
| class="fn org" | Gildersome
| class="adr" | Leeds
| class="note" | 
| class="note" | 
|- class="vcard"
| class="fn org" | Gildersome Street
| class="adr" | Leeds
| class="note" | 
| class="note" | 
|- class="vcard"
| class="fn org" | Gildingwells
| class="adr" | Rotherham
| class="note" | 
| class="note" | 
|- class="vcard"
| class="fn org" | Gilesgate
| class="adr" | Durham
| class="note" | 
| class="note" | 
|- class="vcard"
| class="fn org" | Gilesgate Moor
| class="adr" | Durham
| class="note" | 
| class="note" | 
|- class="vcard"
| class="fn org" | Gileston
| class="adr" | The Vale Of Glamorgan
| class="note" | 
| class="note" | 
|- class="vcard"
| class="fn org" | Gilfach
| class="adr" | Caerphilly
| class="note" | 
| class="note" | 
|- class="vcard"
| class="fn org" | Gilfach
| class="adr" | Herefordshire
| class="note" | 
| class="note" | 
|- class="vcard"
| class="fn org" | Gilfach Goch
| class="adr" | Rhondda, Cynon, Taff
| class="note" | 
| class="note" | 
|- class="vcard"
| class="fn org" | Gilfachreda
| class="adr" | Ceredigion
| class="note" | 
| class="note" | 
|- class="vcard"
| class="fn org" | Gilgarran
| class="adr" | Cumbria
| class="note" | 
| class="note" | 
|- class="vcard"
| class="fn org" | Gill
| class="adr" | North Yorkshire
| class="note" | 
| class="note" | 
|- class="vcard"
| class="fn org" | Gillamoor
| class="adr" | North Yorkshire
| class="note" | 
| class="note" | 
|- class="vcard"
| class="fn org" | Gillan
| class="adr" | Cornwall
| class="note" | 
| class="note" | 
|- class="vcard"
| class="fn org" | Gillarona
| class="adr" | Shetland Islands
| class="note" | 
| class="note" | 
|- class="vcard"
| class="fn org" | Gillbank
| class="adr" | Cumbria
| class="note" | 
| class="note" | 
|- class="vcard"
| class="fn org" | Gillbent
| class="adr" | Cheshire
| class="note" | 
| class="note" | 
|- class="vcard"
| class="fn org" | Gillen
| class="adr" | Highland
| class="note" | 
| class="note" | 
|- class="vcard"
| class="fn org" | Gillesbie
| class="adr" | Dumfries and Galloway
| class="note" | 
| class="note" | 
|- class="vcard"
| class="fn org" | Gilling East
| class="adr" | North Yorkshire
| class="note" | 
| class="note" | 
|- class="vcard"
| class="fn org" | Gillingham
| class="adr" | Dorset
| class="note" | 
| class="note" | 
|- class="vcard"
| class="fn org" | Gillingham
| class="adr" | Norfolk
| class="note" | 
| class="note" | 
|- class="vcard"
| class="fn org" | Gillingham
| class="adr" | Kent
| class="note" | 
| class="note" | 
|- class="vcard"
| class="fn org" | Gilling West
| class="adr" | North Yorkshire
| class="note" | 
| class="note" | 
|- class="vcard"
| class="fn org" | Gillmoss
| class="adr" | Liverpool
| class="note" | 
| class="note" | 
|- class="vcard"
| class="fn org" | Gillow Heath
| class="adr" | Staffordshire
| class="note" | 
| class="note" | 
|- class="vcard"
| class="fn org" | Gills
| class="adr" | Highland
| class="note" | 
| class="note" | 
|- class="vcard"
| class="fn org" | Gill's Green
| class="adr" | Kent
| class="note" | 
| class="note" | 
|- class="vcard"
| class="fn org" | Gillway
| class="adr" | Staffordshire
| class="note" | 
| class="note" | 
|- class="vcard"
| class="fn org" | Gilmanscleuch
| class="adr" | Scottish Borders
| class="note" | 
| class="note" | 
|- class="vcard"
| class="fn org" | Gilmerton
| class="adr" | City of Edinburgh
| class="note" | 
| class="note" | 
|- class="vcard"
| class="fn org" | Gilmerton
| class="adr" | Perth and Kinross
| class="note" | 
| class="note" | 
|- class="vcard"
| class="fn org" | Gilmonby
| class="adr" | Durham
| class="note" | 
| class="note" | 
|- class="vcard"
| class="fn org" | Gilmorton
| class="adr" | Leicestershire
| class="note" | 
| class="note" | 
|- class="vcard"
| class="fn org" | Gilmourton
| class="adr" | South Lanarkshire
| class="note" | 
| class="note" | 
|- class="vcard"
| class="fn org" | Gilnow
| class="adr" | Bolton
| class="note" | 
| class="note" | 
|- class="vcard"
| class="fn org" | Gilroyd
| class="adr" | Barnsley
| class="note" | 
| class="note" | 
|- class="vcard"
| class="fn org" | Gilsay
| class="adr" | Western Isles
| class="note" | 
| class="note" | 
|- class="vcard"
| class="fn org" | Gilsland
| class="adr" | Cumbria
| class="note" | 
| class="note" | 
|- class="vcard"
| class="fn org" | Gilson
| class="adr" | Warwickshire
| class="note" | 
| class="note" | 
|- class="vcard"
| class="fn org" | Gilstead
| class="adr" | Bradford
| class="note" | 
| class="note" | 
|- class="vcard"
| class="fn org" | Gilston
| class="adr" | Hertfordshire
| class="note" | 
| class="note" | 
|- class="vcard"
| class="fn org" | Gilston
| class="adr" | Scottish Borders
| class="note" | 
| class="note" | 
|- class="vcard"
| class="fn org" | Gilston Park
| class="adr" | Hertfordshire
| class="note" | 
| class="note" | 
|- class="vcard"
| class="fn org" | Giltbrook
| class="adr" | Nottinghamshire
| class="note" | 
| class="note" | 
|- class="vcard"
| class="fn org" | Gilver's Lane
| class="adr" | Worcestershire
| class="note" | 
| class="note" | 
|- class="vcard"
| class="fn org" | Gilwell Park
| class="adr" | Essex
| class="note" | 
| class="note" | 
|- class="vcard"
| class="fn org" | Gilwern
| class="adr" | Monmouthshire
| class="note" | 
| class="note" | 
|- class="vcard"
| class="fn org" | Gimingham
| class="adr" | Norfolk
| class="note" | 
| class="note" | 
|- class="vcard"
| class="fn org" | Ginclough
| class="adr" | Cheshire
| class="note" | 
| class="note" | 
|- class="vcard"
| class="fn org" | Ginger's Green
| class="adr" | East Sussex
| class="note" | 
| class="note" | 
|- class="vcard"
| class="fn org" | Giosla
| class="adr" | Western Isles
| class="note" | 
| class="note" | 
|- class="vcard"
| class="fn org" | Gipping
| class="adr" | Suffolk
| class="note" | 
| class="note" | 
|- class="vcard"
| class="fn org" | Gipsey Bridge
| class="adr" | Lincolnshire
| class="note" | 
| class="note" | 
|- class="vcard"
| class="fn org" | Gipsy Row
| class="adr" | Suffolk
| class="note" | 
| class="note" | 
|- class="vcard"
| class="fn org" | Gipsyville
| class="adr" | City of Kingston upon Hull
| class="note" | 
| class="note" | 
|- class="vcard"
| class="fn org" | Gipton
| class="adr" | Leeds
| class="note" | 
| class="note" | 
|- class="vcard"
| class="fn org" | Gipton Wood
| class="adr" | Leeds
| class="note" | 
| class="note" | 
|- class="vcard"
| class="fn org" | Girdle Ness
| class="adr" | City of Aberdeen
| class="note" | 
| class="note" | 
|- class="vcard"
| class="fn org" | Girdle Toll
| class="adr" | North Ayrshire
| class="note" | 
| class="note" | 
|- class="vcard"
| class="fn org" | Girlington
| class="adr" | Bradford
| class="note" | 
| class="note" | 
|- class="vcard"
| class="fn org" | Girlsta
| class="adr" | Shetland Islands
| class="note" | 
| class="note" | 
|- class="vcard"
| class="fn org" | Girsby
| class="adr" | Darlington
| class="note" | 
| class="note" | 
|- class="vcard"
| class="fn org" | Girsby
| class="adr" | Lincolnshire
| class="note" | 
| class="note" | 
|- class="vcard"
| class="fn org" | Girt
| class="adr" | Somerset
| class="note" | 
| class="note" | 
|- class="vcard"
| class="fn org" | Girthon
| class="adr" | Dumfries and Galloway
| class="note" | 
| class="note" | 
|- class="vcard"
| class="fn org" | Girton
| class="adr" | Cambridgeshire
| class="note" | 
| class="note" | 
|- class="vcard"
| class="fn org" | Girton
| class="adr" | Nottinghamshire
| class="note" | 
| class="note" | 
|- class="vcard"
| class="fn org" | Gisburn
| class="adr" | Lancashire
| class="note" | 
| class="note" | 
|- class="vcard"
| class="fn org" | Gisleham
| class="adr" | Suffolk
| class="note" | 
| class="note" | 
|- class="vcard"
| class="fn org" | Gislingham
| class="adr" | Suffolk
| class="note" | 
| class="note" | 
|- class="vcard"
| class="fn org" | Gissing
| class="adr" | Norfolk
| class="note" | 
| class="note" | 
|- class="vcard"
| class="fn org" | Gittisham
| class="adr" | Devon
| class="note" | 
| class="note" | 
|- class="vcard"
| class="fn org" | Givons Grove
| class="adr" | Surrey
| class="note" | 
| class="note" | 
|}

Gl

Gla

|- class="vcard"
| class="fn org" | Glackmore
| class="adr" | Highland
| class="note" | 
| class="note" | 
|- class="vcard"
| class="fn org" | Gladestry
| class="adr" | Powys
| class="note" | 
| class="note" | 
|- class="vcard"
| class="fn org" | Gladsmuir
| class="adr" | East Lothian
| class="note" | 
| class="note" | 
|- class="vcard"
| class="fn org" | Glaichbea
| class="adr" | Highland
| class="note" | 
| class="note" | 
|- class="vcard"
| class="fn org" | Glaick
| class="adr" | Highland
| class="note" | 
| class="note" | 
|- class="vcard"
| class="fn org" | Glais
| class="adr" | Swansea
| class="note" | 
| class="note" | 
|- class="vcard"
| class="fn org" | Glaisdale
| class="adr" | North Yorkshire
| class="note" | 
| class="note" | 
|- class="vcard"
| class="fn org" | Glamis
| class="adr" | Angus
| class="note" | 
| class="note" | 
|- class="vcard"
| class="fn org" | Glan Adda
| class="adr" | Gwynedd
| class="note" | 
| class="note" | 
|- class="vcard"
| class="fn org" | Glanafon
| class="adr" | Pembrokeshire
| class="note" | 
| class="note" | 
|- class="vcard"
| class="fn org" | Glanaman
| class="adr" | Carmarthenshire
| class="note" | 
| class="note" | 
|- class="vcard"
| class="fn org" | Glandford
| class="adr" | Norfolk
| class="note" | 
| class="note" | 
|- class="vcard"
| class="fn org" | Glandwr
| class="adr" | Pembrokeshire
| class="note" | 
| class="note" | 
|- class="vcard"
| class="fn org" | Glandwr
| class="adr" | Caerphilly
| class="note" | 
| class="note" | 
|- class="vcard"
| class="fn org" | Glan Dwyfach
| class="adr" | Gwynedd
| class="note" | 
| class="note" | 
|- class="vcard"
| class="fn org" | Glandy Cross
| class="adr" | Carmarthenshire
| class="note" | 
| class="note" | 
|- class="vcard"
| class="fn org" | Glandyfi
| class="adr" | Ceredigion
| class="note" | 
| class="note" | 
|- class="vcard"
| class="fn org" | Glangrwyney
| class="adr" | Powys
| class="note" | 
| class="note" | 
|- class="vcard"
| class="fn org" | Glanhanog
| class="adr" | Powys
| class="note" | 
| class="note" | 
|- class="vcard"
| class="fn org" | Glanmule
| class="adr" | Powys
| class="note" | 
| class="note" | 
|- class="vcard"
| class="fn org" | Glanmwrwg
| class="adr" | Carmarthenshire
| class="note" | 
| class="note" | 
|- class="vcard"
| class="fn org" | Glanyrafon or Glanrafon
| class="adr" | Ceredigion
| class="note" | 
| class="note" | 
|- class="vcard"
| class="fn org" | Glanrhyd
| class="adr" | Pembrokeshire
| class="note" | 
| class="note" | 
|- class="vcard"
| class="fn org" | Glan-rhyd
| class="adr" | Neath Port Talbot
| class="note" | 
| class="note" | 
|- class="vcard"
| class="fn org" | Glantlees
| class="adr" | Northumberland
| class="note" | 
| class="note" | 
|- class="vcard"
| class="fn org" | Glanton
| class="adr" | Northumberland
| class="note" | 
| class="note" | 
|- class="vcard"
| class="fn org" | Glanvilles Wootton
| class="adr" | Dorset
| class="note" | 
| class="note" | 
|- class="vcard"
| class="fn org" | Glanwern
| class="adr" | Ceredigion
| class="note" | 
| class="note" | 
|- class="vcard"
| class="fn org" | Glanwydden
| class="adr" | Conwy
| class="note" | 
| class="note" | 
|- class="vcard"
| class="fn org" | Glan-y-don
| class="adr" | Flintshire
| class="note" | 
| class="note" | 
|- class="vcard"
| class="fn org" | Glan-y-llyn
| class="adr" | Cardiff
| class="note" | 
| class="note" | 
|- class="vcard"
| class="fn org" | Glanymor
| class="adr" | Carmarthenshire
| class="note" | 
| class="note" | 
|- class="vcard"
| class="fn org" | Glan-y-nant
| class="adr" | Powys
| class="note" | 
| class="note" | 
|- class="vcard"
| class="fn org" | Glan-y-nant
| class="adr" | Caerphilly
| class="note" | 
| class="note" | 
|- class="vcard"
| class="fn org" | Glan-yr-afon
| class="adr" | Isle of Anglesey
| class="note" | 
| class="note" | 
|- class="vcard"
| class="fn org" | Glan-yr-afon
| class="adr" | Flintshire
| class="note" | 
| class="note" | 
|- class="vcard"
| class="fn org" | Glan-yr-afon
| class="adr" | Gwynedd
| class="note" | 
| class="note" | 
|- class="vcard"
| class="fn org" | Glan-yr-afon
| class="adr" | Shropshire
| class="note" | 
| class="note" | 
|- class="vcard"
| class="fn org" | Glan-y-wern
| class="adr" | Gwynedd
| class="note" | 
| class="note" | 
|- class="vcard"
| class="fn org" | Glapthorn
| class="adr" | Northamptonshire
| class="note" | 
| class="note" | 
|- class="vcard"
| class="fn org" | Glapwell
| class="adr" | Derbyshire
| class="note" | 
| class="note" | 
|- class="vcard"
| class="fn org" | Glasbury
| class="adr" | Powys
| class="note" | 
| class="note" | 
|- class="vcard"
| class="fn org" | Glascoed
| class="adr" | Powys
| class="note" | 
| class="note" | 
|- class="vcard"
| class="fn org" | Glascoed
| class="adr" | Carmarthenshire
| class="note" | 
| class="note" | 
|- class="vcard"
| class="fn org" | Glascoed
| class="adr" | Monmouthshire
| class="note" | 
| class="note" | 
|- class="vcard"
| class="fn org" | Glascoed
| class="adr" | Denbighshire
| class="note" | 
| class="note" | 
|- class="vcard"
| class="fn org" | Glascoed
| class="adr" | Wrexham
| class="note" | 
| class="note" | 
|- class="vcard"
| class="fn org" | Glascote
| class="adr" | Staffordshire
| class="note" | 
| class="note" | 
|- class="vcard"
| class="fn org" | Glascwm
| class="adr" | Powys
| class="note" | 
| class="note" | 
|- class="vcard"
| class="fn org" | Glasdir
| class="adr" | Flintshire
| class="note" | 
| class="note" | 
|- class="vcard"
| class="fn org" | Glas Eilean
| class="adr" | Highland
| class="note" | 
| class="note" | 
|- class="vcard"
| class="fn org" | Glasfryn
| class="adr" | Conwy
| class="note" | 
| class="note" | 
|- class="vcard"
| class="fn org" | Glasgoed
| class="adr" | Ceredigion
| class="note" | 
| class="note" | 
|- class="vcard"
| class="fn org" | Glasgow
| class="adr" | City of Glasgow
| class="note" | 
| class="note" | 
|- class="vcard"
| class="fn org" | Glashvin
| class="adr" | Highland
| class="note" | 
| class="note" | 
|- class="vcard"
| class="fn org" | Glasinfryn
| class="adr" | Gwynedd
| class="note" | 
| class="note" | 
|- class="vcard"
| class="fn org" | Glasllwch
| class="adr" | City of Newport
| class="note" | 
| class="note" | 
|- class="vcard"
| class="fn org" | Glasnacardoch
| class="adr" | Highland
| class="note" | 
| class="note" | 
|- class="vcard"
| class="fn org" | Glasnakille
| class="adr" | Highland
| class="note" | 
| class="note" | 
|- class="vcard"
| class="fn org" | Glasphein
| class="adr" | Highland
| class="note" | 
| class="note" | 
|- class="vcard"
| class="fn org" | Glaspwll
| class="adr" | Ceredigion
| class="note" | 
| class="note" | 
|- class="vcard"
| class="fn org" | Glassenbury
| class="adr" | Kent
| class="note" | 
| class="note" | 
|- class="vcard"
| class="fn org" | Glassford
| class="adr" | South Lanarkshire
| class="note" | 
| class="note" | 
|- class="vcard"
| class="fn org" | Glass Houghton
| class="adr" | Wakefield
| class="note" | 
| class="note" | 
|- class="vcard"
| class="fn org" | Glasshouse
| class="adr" | Gloucestershire
| class="note" | 
| class="note" | 
|- class="vcard"
| class="fn org" | Glasshouses
| class="adr" | North Yorkshire
| class="note" | 
| class="note" | 
|- class="vcard"
| class="fn org" | Glasson (Bowness)
| class="adr" | Cumbria
| class="note" | 
| class="note" | 
|- class="vcard"
| class="fn org" | Glasson (Maryport)
| class="adr" | Cumbria
| class="note" | 
| class="note" | 
|- class="vcard"
| class="fn org" | Glasson
| class="adr" | Lancashire
| class="note" | 
| class="note" | 
|- class="vcard"
| class="fn org" | Glassonby
| class="adr" | Cumbria
| class="note" | 
| class="note" | 
|- class="vcard"
| class="fn org" | Glaston
| class="adr" | Rutland
| class="note" | 
| class="note" | 
|- class="vcard"
| class="fn org" | Glastonbury
| class="adr" | Somerset
| class="note" | 
| class="note" | 
|- class="vcard"
| class="fn org" | Glatton
| class="adr" | Cambridgeshire
| class="note" | 
| class="note" | 
|- class="vcard"
| class="fn org" | Glazebrook
| class="adr" | Cheshire
| class="note" | 
| class="note" | 
|- class="vcard"
| class="fn org" | Glazebury
| class="adr" | Cheshire
| class="note" | 
| class="note" | 
|- class="vcard"
| class="fn org" | Glazeley
| class="adr" | Shropshire
| class="note" | 
| class="note" | 
|}

Gle

|- class="vcard"
| class="fn org" | Gleadless
| class="adr" | Sheffield
| class="note" | 
| class="note" | 
|- class="vcard"
| class="fn org" | Gleadless Valley
| class="adr" | Sheffield
| class="note" | 
| class="note" | 
|- class="vcard"
| class="fn org" | Gleadmoss
| class="adr" | Cheshire
| class="note" | 
| class="note" | 
|- class="vcard"
| class="fn org" | Gleaston
| class="adr" | Cumbria
| class="note" | 
| class="note" | 
|- class="vcard"
| class="fn org" | Glebe
| class="adr" | Hampshire
| class="note" | 
| class="note" | 
|- class="vcard"
| class="fn org" | Glebe
| class="adr" | Shetland Islands
| class="note" | 
| class="note" | 
|- class="vcard"
| class="fn org" | Glebe
| class="adr" | Sunderland
| class="note" | 
| class="note" | 
|- class="vcard"
| class="fn org" | Gledhow
| class="adr" | Leeds
| class="note" | 
| class="note" | 
|- class="vcard"
| class="fn org" | Gledrid
| class="adr" | Shropshire
| class="note" | 
| class="note" | 
|- class="vcard"
| class="fn org" | Gleiniant
| class="adr" | Powys
| class="note" | 
| class="note" | 
|- class="vcard"
| class="fn org" | Glemsford
| class="adr" | Suffolk
| class="note" | 
| class="note" | 
|- class="vcard"
| class="fn org" | Glenacardoch Point
| class="adr" | Argyll and Bute
| class="note" | 
| class="note" | 
|- class="vcard"
| class="fn org" | Glen Albyn (Glen Mor)
| class="adr" | Highland
| class="note" | 
| class="note" | 
|- class="vcard"
| class="fn org" | Glenancross
| class="adr" | Highland
| class="note" | 
| class="note" | 
|- class="vcard"
| class="fn org" | Glen Auldyn
| class="adr" | Isle of Man
| class="note" | 
| class="note" | 
|- class="vcard"
| class="fn org" | Glenbarr
| class="adr" | Argyll and Bute
| class="note" | 
| class="note" | 
|- class="vcard"
| class="fn org" | Glenbarry
| class="adr" | Moray
| class="note" | 
| class="note" | 
|- class="vcard"
| class="fn org" | Glen Bernisdale
| class="adr" | Highland
| class="note" | 
| class="note" | 
|- class="vcard"
| class="fn org" | Glenbervie
| class="adr" | Aberdeenshire
| class="note" | 
| class="note" | 
|- class="vcard"
| class="fn org" | Glenboig
| class="adr" | North Lanarkshire
| class="note" | 
| class="note" | 
|- class="vcard"
| class="fn org" | Glenborrodale
| class="adr" | Highland
| class="note" | 
| class="note" | 
|- class="vcard"
| class="fn org" | Glen Branter
| class="adr" | Argyll and Bute
| class="note" | 
| class="note" | 
|- class="vcard"
| class="fn org" | Glenbranter
| class="adr" | Argyll and Bute
| class="note" | 
| class="note" | 
|- class="vcard"
| class="fn org" | Glenbreck
| class="adr" | Scottish Borders
| class="note" | 
| class="note" | 
|- class="vcard"
| class="fn org" | Glenbrock
| class="adr" | City of Edinburgh
| class="note" | 
| class="note" | 
|- class="vcard"
| class="fn org" | Glenbuck
| class="adr" | East Ayrshire
| class="note" | 
| class="note" | 
|- class="vcard"
| class="fn org" | Glenburn 
| class="adr" | Renfrewshire
| class="note" | 
| class="note" | 
|- class="vcard"
| class="fn org" | Glencaple
| class="adr" | Dumfries and Galloway
| class="note" | 
| class="note" | 
|- class="vcard"
| class="fn org" | Glencarse
| class="adr" | Perth and Kinross
| class="note" | 
| class="note" | 
|- class="vcard"
| class="fn org" | Glenchass
| class="adr" | Isle of Man
| class="note" | 
| class="note" | 
|- class="vcard"
| class="fn org" | Glencoe
| class="adr" | Highland
| class="note" | 
| class="note" | 
|- class="vcard"
| class="fn org" | Glencraig
| class="adr" | Fife
| class="note" | 
| class="note" | 
|- class="vcard"
| class="fn org" | Glendale
| class="adr" | Highland
| class="note" | 
| class="note" | 
|- class="vcard"
| class="fn org" | Glendearg
| class="adr" | Scottish Borders
| class="note" | 
| class="note" | 
|- class="vcard"
| class="fn org" | Glendevon
| class="adr" | Perth and Kinross
| class="note" | 
| class="note" | 
|- class="vcard"
| class="fn org" | Glendoick
| class="adr" | Perth and Kinross
| class="note" | 
| class="note" | 
|- class="vcard"
| class="fn org" | Glenduckie
| class="adr" | Fife
| class="note" | 
| class="note" | 
|- class="vcard"
| class="fn org" | Glenegedale
| class="adr" | Argyll and Bute
| class="note" | 
| class="note" | 
|- class="vcard"
| class="fn org" | Glenelg
| class="adr" | Highland
| class="note" | 
| class="note" | 
|- class="vcard"
| class="fn org" | Glenfarg
| class="adr" | Perth and Kinross
| class="note" | 
| class="note" | 
|- class="vcard"
| class="fn org" | Glenfield
| class="adr" | City of Leicester
| class="note" | 
| class="note" | 
|- class="vcard"
| class="fn org" | Glenfinnan
| class="adr" | Highland
| class="note" | 
| class="note" | 
|- class="vcard"
| class="fn org" | Glenfoot
| class="adr" | Perth and Kinross
| class="note" | 
| class="note" | 
|- class="vcard"
| class="fn org" | Glengarnock
| class="adr" | North Ayrshire
| class="note" | 
| class="note" | 
|- class="vcard"
| class="fn org" | Glengrasco
| class="adr" | Highland
| class="note" | 
| class="note" | 
|- class="vcard"
| class="fn org" | Glen Heysdal
| class="adr" | Highland
| class="note" | 
| class="note" | 
|- class="vcard"
| class="fn org" | Glenholt
| class="adr" | Devon
| class="note" | 
| class="note" | 
|- class="vcard"
| class="fn org" | Glenhurich
| class="adr" | Highland
| class="note" | 
| class="note" | 
|- class="vcard"
| class="fn org" | Glenkindie
| class="adr" | Aberdeenshire
| class="note" | 
| class="note" | 
|- class="vcard"
| class="fn org" | Glenleigh Park
| class="adr" | East Sussex
| class="note" | 
| class="note" | 
|- class="vcard"
| class="fn org" | Glenlivet
| class="adr" | Moray
| class="note" | 
| class="note" | 
|- class="vcard"
| class="fn org" | Glenlochar
| class="adr" | Dumfries and Galloway
| class="note" | 
| class="note" | 
|- class="vcard"
| class="fn org" | Glenlomond
| class="adr" | Perth and Kinross
| class="note" | 
| class="note" | 
|- class="vcard"
| class="fn org" | Glenluce
| class="adr" | Dumfries and Galloway
| class="note" | 
| class="note" | 
|- class="vcard"
| class="fn org" | Glenmarkie Lodge
| class="adr" | Angus
| class="note" | 
| class="note" | 
|- class="vcard"
| class="fn org" | Glenmavis
| class="adr" | West Lothian
| class="note" | 
| class="note" | 
|- class="vcard"
| class="fn org" | Glenmavis
| class="adr" | North Lanarkshire
| class="note" | 
| class="note" | 
|- class="vcard"
| class="fn org" | Glenmaye
| class="adr" | Isle of Man
| class="note" | 
| class="note" | 
|- class="vcard"
| class="fn org" | Glenmayne
| class="adr" | Scottish Borders
| class="note" | 
| class="note" | 
|- class="vcard"
| class="fn org" | Glen Mona
| class="adr" | Isle of Man
| class="note" | 
| class="note" | 
|- class="vcard"
| class="fn org" | Glen Mor (Glen Albyn)
| class="adr" | Highland
| class="note" | 
| class="note" | 
|- class="vcard"
| class="fn org" | Glenmore
| class="adr" | Highland
| class="note" | 
| class="note" | 
|- class="vcard"
| class="fn org" | Glen of Newmill
| class="adr" | Moray
| class="note" | 
| class="note" | 
|- class="vcard"
| class="fn org" | Glenogil
| class="adr" | Angus
| class="note" | 
| class="note" | 
|- class="vcard"
| class="fn org" | Glenowen
| class="adr" | Pembrokeshire
| class="note" | 
| class="note" | 
|- class="vcard"
| class="fn org" | Glen Parva
| class="adr" | Leicestershire
| class="note" | 
| class="note" | 
|- class="vcard"
| class="fn org" | Glenprosen Village
| class="adr" | Angus
| class="note" | 
| class="note" | 
|- class="vcard"
| class="fn org" | Glenrath
| class="adr" | Scottish Borders
| class="note" | 
| class="note" | 
|- class="vcard"
| class="fn org" | Glenridding
| class="adr" | Cumbria
| class="note" | 
| class="note" | 
|- class="vcard"
| class="fn org" | Glenrothes
| class="adr" | Fife
| class="note" | 
| class="note" | 
|- class="vcard"
| class="fn org" | Glensanda
| class="adr" | Highland
| class="note" | 
| class="note" | 
|- class="vcard"
| class="fn org" | Glensburgh
| class="adr" | Falkirk
| class="note" | 
| class="note" | 
|- class="vcard"
| class="fn org" | Glenstockadale
| class="adr" | Dumfries and Galloway
| class="note" | 
| class="note" | 
|- class="vcard"
| class="fn org" | Glenternie
| class="adr" | Scottish Borders
| class="note" | 
| class="note" | 
|- class="vcard"
| class="fn org" | Glentham
| class="adr" | Lincolnshire
| class="note" | 
| class="note" | 
|- class="vcard"
| class="fn org" | Glentirranmuir
| class="adr" | Stirling
| class="note" | 
| class="note" | 
|- class="vcard"
| class="fn org" | Glentress
| class="adr" | Scottish Borders
| class="note" | 
| class="note" | 
|- class="vcard"
| class="fn org" | Glentrool Village
| class="adr" | Dumfries and Galloway
| class="note" | 
| class="note" | 
|- class="vcard"
| class="fn org" | Glentruan
| class="adr" | Isle of Man
| class="note" | 
| class="note" | 
|- class="vcard"
| class="fn org" | Glentworth
| class="adr" | Lincolnshire
| class="note" | 
| class="note" | 
|- class="vcard"
| class="fn org" | Glenuig
| class="adr" | Highland
| class="note" | 
| class="note" | 
|- class="vcard"
| class="fn org" | Glenview
| class="adr" | Argyll and Bute
| class="note" | 
| class="note" | 
|- class="vcard"
| class="fn org" | Glen Village
| class="adr" | Falkirk
| class="note" | 
| class="note" | 
|- class="vcard"
| class="fn org" | Glespin
| class="adr" | South Lanarkshire
| class="note" | 
| class="note" | 
|- class="vcard"
| class="fn org" | Gletness
| class="adr" | Shetland Islands
| class="note" | 
| class="note" | 
|- class="vcard"
| class="fn org" | Glewstone
| class="adr" | Herefordshire
| class="note" | 
| class="note" | 
|}

Gli-Gly

|- class="vcard"
| class="fn org" | Glib Cheois
| class="adr" | Western Isles
| class="note" | 
| class="note" | 
|- class="vcard"
| class="fn org" | Glimps Holm
| class="adr" | Orkney Islands
| class="note" | 
| class="note" | 
|- class="vcard"
| class="fn org" | Glinton
| class="adr" | Cambridgeshire
| class="note" | 
| class="note" | 
|- class="vcard"
| class="fn org" | Globe Town
| class="adr" | Tower Hamlets
| class="note" | 
| class="note" | 
|- class="vcard"
| class="fn org" | Glodwick
| class="adr" | Oldham
| class="note" | 
| class="note" | 
|- class="vcard"
| class="fn org" | Glogue
| class="adr" | Pembrokeshire
| class="note" | 
| class="note" | 
|- class="vcard"
| class="fn org" | Glooston
| class="adr" | Leicestershire
| class="note" | 
| class="note" | 
|- class="vcard"
| class="fn org" | Glororum
| class="adr" | Northumberland
| class="note" | 
| class="note" | 
|- class="vcard"
| class="fn org" | Glossop
| class="adr" | Derbyshire
| class="note" | 
| class="note" | 
|- class="vcard"
| class="fn org" | Gloucester
| class="adr" | Gloucestershire
| class="note" | 
| class="note" | 
|- class="vcard"
| class="fn org" | Gloup
| class="adr" | Shetland Islands
| class="note" | 
| class="note" | 
|- class="vcard"
| class="fn org" | Gloup Holm
| class="adr" | Shetland Islands
| class="note" | 
| class="note" | 
|- class="vcard"
| class="fn org" | Gloweth
| class="adr" | Cornwall
| class="note" | 
| class="note" | 
|- class="vcard"
| class="fn org" | Glutton Bridge
| class="adr" | Staffordshire
| class="note" | 
| class="note" | 
|- class="vcard"
| class="fn org" | Gluvian
| class="adr" | Cornwall
| class="note" | 
| class="note" | 
|- class="vcard"
| class="fn org" | Glyder Fawr
| class="adr" | Gwynedd
| class="note" | 
| class="note" | 
|- class="vcard"
| class="fn org" | Glympton
| class="adr" | Oxfordshire
| class="note" | 
| class="note" | 
|- class="vcard"
| class="fn org" | Glyndon
| class="adr" | Greenwich
| class="note" | 
| class="note" | 
|- class="vcard"
| class="fn org" | Glyn
| class="adr" | Powys
| class="note" | 
| class="note" | 
|- class="vcard"
| class="fn org" | Glyn
| class="adr" | Monmouthshire
| class="note" | 
| class="note" | 
|- class="vcard"
| class="fn org" | Glynarthen
| class="adr" | Ceredigion
| class="note" | 
| class="note" | 
|- class="vcard"
| class="fn org" | Glynbrochan
| class="adr" | Powys
| class="note" | 
| class="note" | 
|- class="vcard"
| class="fn org" | Glyn Castle
| class="adr" | Neath Port Talbot
| class="note" | 
| class="note" | 
|- class="vcard"
| class="fn org" | Glyn Ceiriog
| class="adr" | Wrexham
| class="note" | 
| class="note" | 
|- class="vcard"
| class="fn org" | Glyncoch
| class="adr" | Rhondda, Cynon, Taff
| class="note" | 
| class="note" | 
|- class="vcard"
| class="fn org" | Glyncoed
| class="adr" | Blaenau Gwent
| class="note" | 
| class="note" | 
|- class="vcard"
| class="fn org" | Glyncorrwg
| class="adr" | Neath Port Talbot
| class="note" | 
| class="note" | 
|- class="vcard"
| class="fn org" | Glynde
| class="adr" | East Sussex
| class="note" | 
| class="note" | 
|- class="vcard"
| class="fn org" | Glyndebourne
| class="adr" | East Sussex
| class="note" | 
| class="note" | 
|- class="vcard"
| class="fn org" | Glyndyfrdwy
| class="adr" | Denbighshire
| class="note" | 
| class="note" | 
|- class="vcard"
| class="fn org" | Glyne Gap
| class="adr" | East Sussex
| class="note" | 
| class="note" | 
|- class="vcard"
| class="fn org" | Glyn Ebwy
| class="adr" | Blaenau Gwent
| class="note" | 
| class="note" | 
|- class="vcard"
| class="fn org" | Glynhafren
| class="adr" | Powys
| class="note" | 
| class="note" | 
|- class="vcard"
| class="fn org" | Glynllan
| class="adr" | Bridgend
| class="note" | 
| class="note" | 
|- class="vcard"
| class="fn org" | Glynmorlas
| class="adr" | Shropshire
| class="note" | 
| class="note" | 
|- class="vcard"
| class="fn org" | Glyn-neath
| class="adr" | Neath Port Talbot
| class="note" | 
| class="note" | 
|- class="vcard"
| class="fn org" | Glynogwr
| class="adr" | Bridgend
| class="note" | 
| class="note" | 
|- class="vcard"
| class="fn org" | Glyntaff
| class="adr" | Rhondda, Cynon, Taff
| class="note" | 
| class="note" | 
|- class="vcard"
| class="fn org" | Glyntawe
| class="adr" | Powys
| class="note" | 
| class="note" | 
|}